Farafangana is a city (commune urbaine) on the south-east coast of Madagascar and capital of the Atsimo-Atsinanana region.

Location

Farafangana is the capital of the region Atsimo-Atsinanana located approximately 400 kilometres south of the capital Antananarivo.  It is at the southern end of the Canal des Pangalanes,Madagascar & Comoros, p. 232 (Lonely Planet, 2008) with the mouth of the Manampatrana River located on the north side of the town.  It is 106km south of Manakara, about 2.5 hours travel time away.

Settlements located to the north include Lokandambo, Manambotra, Ambahikarabo and Amboahangimamy, with Ambalolo to the west. To the south are Antananabo, Manambotra Atsimo and Marosondry.

Economy
There is an airport in Farafangana (Farafangana Airport).  One of the main crops in the region is pepper.

Population
Natives are mainly from ethnic groups Antefasy, Rabakara, Antesaka and Zafisoro.

Education
Farafangana has a university.

Tourism
The Manombo Reserve is located at 25 km to Farafangana.

Roads
 National Road RN 12 from Irondro/Mananjary to Vangaindrano in the South.

Rivers
The Manampatrana River has its mouth into the Indian Ocean at Farafangana.

See also
 Diocese of Farafangana 
 Manombo Reserve

References

Cities in Madagascar
Populated places in Atsimo-Atsinanana
Regional capitals in Madagascar